Dyrines is a genus of spiders in the family Trechaleidae. It was first described in 1903 by Simon. , it contains 4 species, from South America and from Panama.

References

Trechaleidae
Araneomorphae genera
Spiders of Central America
Spiders of South America